Theodore Otto Olson (August 27, 1912 – December 9, 1980) was a Major League Baseball player for the Boston Red Sox. He played for the Red Sox for 3 seasons (1936–1938) as a starting pitcher. He threw and batted right-handed. He weighed 185 lb and his height is 6 ft 2 in. On April 14, 1940 Olson was sold by Boston Red Sox to Philadelphia Phillies.

Olson was born in Quincy, Massachusetts. He attended Dartmouth College. As a collegian, he played summer baseball in 1934 and 1935 for the Barnstable town team in the Cape Cod Baseball League, and was one of the league's dominant pitchers.

Career
Olson made his major league debut at age 23 on June 21, 1936 with the Red Sox. As a pitcher, playing 18 games in his career, he earned a career ERA of 7.18. He earned 18 strikeouts also in his career. Olson played his final game on September 13, 1938.

Olson died on December 9, 1980, in Weymouth, Massachusetts. He is buried at St. John the Evangelist Cemetery in Hingham, Massachusetts.

References

External links

Baseball Almanac
Sports Illustrated
Statistics
nyfuturestars

Ted Olson at SABR (Baseball BioProject)

1912 births
1980 deaths
Boston Red Sox players
Major League Baseball pitchers
Minneapolis Millers (baseball) players
Toronto Maple Leafs (International League) players
Louisville Colonels (minor league) players
Baltimore Orioles (IL) players
Dartmouth College alumni
Hyannis Harbor Hawks players
Cape Cod Baseball League players (pre-modern era)
Baseball players from Massachusetts